The Visual Effects Society Award for Outstanding Effects Simulations in an Episode, Commercial, or Real-Time Project is one of the annual awards given by the Visual Effects Society, starting in 2012. It is awarded to visual effects artists for their work in effects simulations.

Winners & Nominees

2010s
Outstanding FX and Simulation Animation in a Commercial or Broadcast Program

Outstanding Effects Simulations in a Commercial, Broadcast Program, or Video Game

Outstanding Effects Simulations in an Episode, Commercial, or Real-Time Project

2020s

Programs with multiple awards
3 awards
 Game of Thrones (HBO)

Programs with multiple nominations

6 nominations
 Game of Thrones (HBO)

3 nominations
 Lost in Space (Netflix)

2 nominations
 The Mandalorian (Disney+)

References

External links
 Visual Effects Society

S
Awards established in 2002